Mauidrillia acuta is an extinct species of sea snail, a marine gastropod mollusk in the family Horaiclavidae.

Description
The length of the shell attains 12.5 mm, its diameter 4 mm.

Distribution
This extinct marine species was found in Tertiary strata of the Chatham Islands and Pitt Island, New Zealand.

References

 Marwick, J. "The Tertiary Mollusca of the Chatham Islands including a generic revision of the New Zealand Pectinidae." Transactions of the New Zealand institute. Vol. 58. No. 4. 1928
 Maxwell, P.A. (2009). Cenozoic Mollusca. pp. 232–254 in Gordon, D.P. (ed.) New Zealand inventory of biodiversity. Volume one. Kingdom Animalia: Radiata, Lophotrochozoa, Deuterostomia. Canterbury University Press, Christchurch

External links

acuta
Gastropods described in 1928